Bike India is a motorcycle magazine published by Next Gen Publishing Ltd. The magazine was launched in 2005 under founder editor Adil Darukhanawala. Indian Motorsport legend and Isle of Man TT alum Aspi Bhathena has been at the helm of the magazine since 2008. Bike India is considered the oldest pure motorcycle magazine in India. The magazine's editorial office is based out of the city of Pune. The magazine covers the entire gamut of two-wheeled motorised vehicles – from electric scooters to the most powerful superbikes available on the market and everything in between. Bike India was also the only Asian publication and one of eight publications from the world over to ride Ducati's World Super Bike Factory race bike with Chaz Davies.

Bike India is a jury member for the Indian Motorcycle of the Year award since, the award's inception in 2007, and has also held its own annual year-end automotive awards since the magazine's formation. 

In 2007, EMAP, which then published Bike in the UK, took a 40.1% stake in Next Gen.

References

External links
 Official website

2005 establishments in Maharashtra
English-language magazines published in India
Sports magazines published in India
Magazines established in 2005
Motorcycle magazines
Companies based in Pune
Mass media in Pune